Bangalore City–Ernakulam Intercity Express is an Intercity express train which runs daily between Bangalore City Junction and Ernakulam Junction via Hosur.

History
In the railway budget of the year 1997–98, a plan was proposed to introduce a superfast train between Coimbatore and Bangalore. On 15 April 1998, Bangalore–Coimbatore Intercity Express train was inaugurated as Train no: 2677. In the year 2008, the service was extended till Ernakulam as Train no: 12677 after few temporary runs.

On 13 February 2015, the train derailed on its onward journey to Ernakulam from Bangalore, leading to 10 deaths and injuring 150 people.

Train information
It is hauled by a Golden Rock-based WDP4D (earlier Erode-based), WDG4 or WDP4B or an Erode-based WDM-3D from Bangalore to Erode. From Erode to Ernakulam, it is hauled by an Erode-based WAP-4. This train runs daily each way, as Train no: 12677 (Ernakulam Exp) departing Bangalore City Junction  at 06:10hrs and reaching Ernakulam Junction at 16:55 hrs and Train no: 12678 (Bangalore Exp) departing Ernakulam Junction at 09:10 hrs and reaching Bangalore City Junction at 19:50 hrs. It runs with an ICF rake. The rake of the train usually contains 4 unreserved coaches, 11 second sitting coaches, 2 AC chair car coaches, a pantry car, a high-capacity parcel van, and 2 SLR cars, making a total of 21 coaches. It is running due to the COVID-19 pandemic as 02677/02678 and is hauled by a Golden Rock-based WDP4D or WDP4B throughout the journey.

For first time, from July 2, 2022, full end-to-end run with electric locomotive run has started using a "WAP-7"(locomotive) based out of Royapuram Electric Loco Shed after the commissioning of electrification along the Bengaluru (Baiyyappanahalli) - Salem line.

Rake/coach composition 

SLR – Sitting cum luggage rake

UR – Unreserved

D – Second sitting

C – AC chair car

PC – Pantry car

HCPV – High-capacity parcel van

References

Intercity Express (Indian Railways) trains
Rail transport in Karnataka
Rail transport in Tamil Nadu
Rail transport in Kerala
Rail transport in Bangalore
Transport in Kochi